In the field of professional broadcasting, an end-to-end workflow (from ingest to playout) is called tapeless when part, or all of it, is made without any use of audio tape recorders or videotape machines; video and audio sources being ingested, recorded, edited and played out entirely on digital video systems.

Digital tapeless recording refers to any recording method using digital data recorded to a medium other than audio/videotape (usually hard disk, CD-style  or flash memory). It is popular in sound recording circles using computers or specialized workstations, and has something of a following among video users as well (in particular, among both low-end camcorder users who want the ultimate in light, silent equipment, and among high-end video and film producers doing high-definition video at such a high bitrate that tape simply cannot keep up. It is also common on mid-to-high end portable voice recorders, which record to formats such as MP3 or ATRAC.

In the 30 years from the mid-1980s to 2015, tapeless production has moved from being an expensive high-end niche application to being the default workflow for professional production. The availability of low cost disk and high-powered CPUs and GPUs in modern computers has also made it affordable for even amateur productions, and often cheaper than solutions using professional tape formats.

It is generally believed that digital tapeless recording is the most robust and easy-to-manage solution for audio and video production. Nevertheless, particularly within the audio world, there has been significant demand for returning to all-analog, even vintage, recording equipment, to achieve a softer, "warmer" sound at the expense of precise sound replication. This has not so much been the case with video production, as vintage equipment is often inoperable or unable to work with current technology, and generally lacks the quality achieved by digital video technology.

See also
Non-linear editing system
Tapeless camcorder

External links 
Illustrated article on the basics of digital recording and playout for broadcasting.

Broadcast engineering
Video
Digital audio recording